Gracilibacillus is a genus of bacteria within the phylum Bacillota. Species within this genus are generally halotolerant.

References 

Bacteria genera
Bacillaceae